Andrej Babiš' Cabinet may refer to:
Andrej Babiš' First Cabinet
Andrej Babiš' Second Cabinet